Xe Pian National Protected Area is a national protected area in Champasak and Attapeu provinces in southern Laos. This forested, hilly park is home to significant wetlands and a great diversity of animal, bird and fish species. It is an ecotourism destination.

Geography
A large part of the park's boundary follows the border with Cambodia. The park's decreed area is  but there have been recent higher estimates of size.

Three significant rivers have portions in the park: Xe Pian, which joins the Xe Kong, and Xe Khampho.

Flora and fauna
The park's main forest type is mixed evergreen covering about 80% of its area. Deciduous forest constitutes a further 17% of the park.

Threatened animal species include elephant, tiger, yellow-cheeked gibbon, gaur, dhole, Asian black bear, sun bear, banteng and the critically endangered Sunda pangolin. Reptiles include Siamese crocodile and Cantor's giant softshell turtle, both endangered.

A part of the Xe Khampho–Xe Pian Important Bird Area (IBA) overlaps the park.  of the IBA's approximate area of  lies in Xe Pian. Bird species of important conservation status in the common IBA and park area include white-winged duck, masked finfoot and white-rumped vulture. Elsewhere in the park important species include giant ibis, sarus crane, red-headed vulture, woolly-necked stork and green peafowl.

Threats
Xe Pian faces a number of environmental threats. A fertiliser plant and a hydropower project have been constructed in the park. There is hunting and poaching of animals for international trade and local consumption. Agricultural activity is taking place in ecologically sensitive areas including park wetlands.
Since 2015 an additional threat is the Golden Apple Snails eating the rice and grass (the Elephants feed on). The locals collect and boil these now to sell at the markets but the sheer numbers are a growing problem.

See also
Protected areas of Laos

References

National Biodiversity Conservation Areas
Protected areas established in 1993
Geography of Champasak province
Geography of Attapeu province
1993 establishments in Laos